Crusis or Crousis (Latin: Crusaea or Crossaea) was called a maritime district of North-West Chalcidice from Potidaea to the Thermaic Gulf. It was named after Crusis the son of Mygdon. The cities of Crusis were: Lipaxus, Combreia, Lisaea, Gigonus, Campsa, Smila, Aeneia and later Antigonia Psaphara.

References
Hazlitt, The Classical Gazetteer > page 125
Travels in northern Greece By William Martin Leake page 451 

Geography of ancient Mygdonia
Geography of ancient Chalcidice
Historical regions in Greece